The  at Tōdai-ji in the city of Nara in Japan, along with the lustration basin in which the image stands, are of the type used in the annual celebrations of the Buddha's birth on 8 April. The statue and its basin date to the Nara period (710-794) and have been designated National Treasures.

Subject

The birth of Shaka, the historical Buddha (Sanskrit: Siddhārtha Gautama or Śākyamuni), is one of the eight major events in the life of the Buddha that formed a popular subject for artistic representation. While Māyā was walking in the Lumbinī gardens and had stopped to pick flowers, the Buddha is said to have emerged from her right side. According to the Dīrghāgama Sūtra, the young prince immediately took seven steps in the four directions and declared "in the Heavens and on Earth, only I am the Venerable One". The Lalitavistara relates that the infant was then bathed by two nāga, Nanda and Upananda, serpent deities or Dragon Kings.

The Sutra on the meritorious action of bathing the Buddha's image was translated into Chinese in 710. Reenacting the legend of the Buddha's birth, the annual rite known as kanbutsu-e ("rite of sprinkling the Buddha", more popularly hana matsuri or "flower festival") sees the bathing of small Buddha statues amidst garlands of flowers. Perfumed water was once used but, since the nineteenth century, this has generally been replaced by sweet hydrangea tea known as amacha. Another variant sees the image repeatedly wiped with a silk cloth rather than anointed.

Celebrations of the Buddha's birth have been staged in Japan on the eighth day of the fourth month since Empress Suiko ordered that vegetarian feasts should be held in all the temples in 606. Kanbutsu-e or "sprinkling" ceremonies are known to have been held at the Seiryōden, led by a priest from Gangō-ji, in 840 and the Engi shiki lists the utensils used at these Palace ceremonies. This example at Tōdai-ji is generally dated to the 750s.

This National Treasure Shaka at Birth was still used in the ceremony when Langdon Warner was writing in the late 1950s and indeed as late as the 1980s. More recently it has been replaced with a copy.

Statue
Evoking the legend of his birth, the statue of the infant Buddha has its right arm raised, pointing to heaven, and left arm pendant, pointing to the earth; he is bare chested and wears a skirt. The elongated earlobes and spiral-shaped curls of hair, resembling snail-shells, are among the eighty secondary physical characteristics of the Buddha. The deep ridges on both body and arms "emphasize the fleshiness" of the smiling child's body. The soft, rounded, "sweet-faced" features of the young Buddha have been likened to those of the celestial musicians on the roughly contemporary octagonal lantern erected in front of the Tōdai-ji Daibutsuden. The original pedestal on which the image stands has been lost and replaced with a small wooden base carved with lotus petals.

Basin
Like the statue, the basin or kanbutsuban is the largest of its type known. The exterior has incised images of human figures, animals real and imaginary, birds, and butterflies, set against a landscape of flowers, grasses, shrubs, trees, mountain peaks, clouds, and pagodas. Images of hermits with banners riding on birds, barbarians in foreign garb astride Chinese lions, and hunters chasing tigers are similar to motifs found on metalwork in Tōdai-ji's celebrated repository the Shōsōin. Much of this decoration is secular rather than Buddhist in inspiration. Like the statue, the basin shows the influence of contemporary Tang China.

Technology
Both statue and basin are of gilt bronze, cast using the lost-wax method. The statue was cast in one piece, other than for the right forearm which is a restoration; the join is clearly visible. Pieces of the clay core were left inside after casting. Both statue and bowl are recognized as masterpieces of eighth-century metalwork.

See also
 List of National Treasures of Japan (sculptures)
 Hanamatsuri
 Vesak

Notes

References

National Treasures of Japan
Japanese sculpture
Bronze sculptures in Japan
Buddha statues in Japan